108 Mile Lake is a glacial lake located in the Cariboo region of British Columbia, Canada. The lake is named after the nearby town 108 Mile Ranch.108 Mile Lake is connected to Sepa Lake (a smaller lake to the south). The channel between the two lakes was dredged in the late 1980s allowing a free flow of water between the
two basins. The lake is a popular fishing, hiking, and mountain biking spot. Fish found in this lake include rainbow trout, bull trout, redside shiners, northern pikeminnows, suckers and coastal cutthroat trout.

See also
List of lakes of British Columbia

References

Lakes of the Cariboo
Mountain lakes
Glacial lakes of Canada
Lillooet Land District